Hemaris diffinis, the snowberry clearwing, is a moth of the order Lepidoptera, family Sphingidae. This moth is sometimes called "hummingbird moth" or "flying lobster". This moth should not be confused with the hummingbird hawk-moth of Europe.

Adults
The moth's abdomen has yellow and black segments much like those of the bumblebee, for whom it might be mistaken due to its color and flight pattern similarities. The moth's wings lack the large amount of scales found in most other lepidopterans, particularly in the centralized regions, making them appear clear. It loses the scales on its wings early after the pupa stage by its highly active flight tendencies.

Biology 
It flies during the daylight much like the other hummingbird moths, but it may also continue flight into the evening, particularly if it has found a good source of nectar.

Distribution
The moth is found from the Northwest Territories, British Columbia, southern Ontario, eastern Manitoba, and in western Quebec in Canada. In the United States this species has been located in southern California and Baja California Norte, Illinois, east through most of the United States from Maine to West Virginia to Florida. Also seen in the Cariboo region of British Columbia.

Food plants
The larvae feed on plants including dogbane (Apocynum), honeysuckle, viburnum, hawthorn, snowberry, cherry, mint, and plum.

Regional names
Hemaris diffinis is notable for its colorful nicknames. In certain parts of Appalachia, including West Virginia, Hemaris diffinis is known as "hummingbird moth" or "flying lobster". These nicknames are derived from its supposed physical resemblance to other (genetically unrelated) animals.

Gallery

References

External links

Silkmoths
Hemaris diffinis, Bug Guide
Butterflies and Moths of North America

D
Moths of North America
Moths described in 1836